Typhlosynbranchus is a genus of swamp eels that are native to West and Central Africa. It contains two species that were formerly classified in the primarily Asian genus Monopterus.

Taxonomy 
The genus was originally formed by Jacques Pellegrin in 1922 for the Liberian swamp eel, but later studies synonymized it with Monopterus. However, a 2020 study found significant divergence between the two taxa and revived the genus for M. boueti and the recently described M. luticolus.

Species 
One of the two species, T. boueti, is primarily found in aquatic environments, while the other (T. luticolus) has a fossorial lifestyle in inundated soil.

 Typhlosynbranchus boueti (Pellegrin, 1922) (Liberian swamp eel)
 Typhlosynbranchus luticolus Britz, Doherty-Bone, Kouete, D. Sykes & Gower, 2016

References 

Freshwater fish genera
Synbranchidae
Taxa described in 1922
Taxa named by Jacques Pellegrin
Fauna of Central Africa